Wexford is a parliamentary constituency represented in Dáil Éireann, the lower house of the Irish parliament or Oireachtas. The constituency elects 5 deputies (Teachtaí Dála, commonly known as TDs) on the system of proportional representation by means of the single transferable vote (PR-STV).

Boundaries
The constituency was created by the Government of Ireland Act 1920 and first used at the 1921 elections electing 4 deputies. It spans the entire area of County Wexford, taking in Wexford, Enniscorthy, New Ross and Gorey.

The Electoral (Amendment) (Dáil Constituencies) Act 2017 defines the constituency as:

TDs

Elections

2020 general election

2019 by-election
A by-election was held in the constituency on 29 November 2019, to fill the seat vacated by Mick Wallace on his election to the European Parliament in May 2019.

2016 general election

2011 general election

2007 general election

2002 general election

1997 general election

1992 general election

1989 general election

1987 general election

November 1982 general election

February 1982 general election

1981 general election

1977 general election

1973 general election

1969 general election

1965 general election

1961 general election

1957 general election

1954 general election

1951 general election

1948 general election

1945 by-election
Following the death of Labour Party TD Richard Corish, a by-election was held on 4 December 1945. The seat was won by the Labour Party candidate Brendan Corish, son of the deceased TD.

1944 general election

1943 general election

1938 general election

1937 general election

1936 by-election
Following the death of Fine Gael TD Osmond Esmonde, a by-election was held on 17 August 1936. The seat was won by the Fianna Fáil candidate Denis Allen, reaching the quota on the first count. Subsequent counts occurred because the distribution of remaining votes could have saved another candidate their election deposit.

1933 general election

1932 general election

September 1927 general election

June 1927 general election

1923 general election

1922 general election

1921 general election

|}

See also
Dáil constituencies
Elections in the Republic of Ireland
Politics of the Republic of Ireland
List of Dáil by-elections
List of political parties in the Republic of Ireland

References

Dáil constituencies
Politics of County Wexford
1921 establishments in Ireland
Constituencies established in 1921